The Men's 1,500m T54 had its First Round held on September 14 at 19:39, its Semifinals on September 15 at 9:23 and its Final on September 16 at 20:27.

Medalists

Results

References

Round 1 - Heat 1
Round 1 - Heat 2
Round 1 - Heat 3
Round 1 - Heat 4
Round 1 - Heat 5
Semifinal - Heat 1
Semifinal - Heat 2
Semifinal - Heat 3
Final

Athletics at the 2008 Summer Paralympics